Cetopsidium roae is a species of whale catfish endemic to Guyana where it is only known from the Rupununi region in the southwest.

References 
 

Cetopsidae
Fish of Guyana
Endemic fauna of Guyana
Fish described in 2005